National Retail Properties, Inc. is a real estate investment trust that invests primarily in high-quality properties that are subject to long-term NNN Leases. It is organized in Maryland with its principal office in Orlando, Florida.

As of December 31, 2019, the company owned 3,118 properties containing 32.5 million square feet, 17.6% of the company's revenue was from properties in Texas, and 8.8% of the company's revenue was from properties in Florida.

History
The company was formed in 1984 as Golden Corral Realty Corp. as a way for the owners of the Golden Corral restaurant chain to allow employees to invest in the company.

In 1993, the company split from Golden Corral, and changed its name to Commercial Net Lease Realty. The company also moved its listing to the New York Stock Exchange.

On January 1, 1998, the company merged with its former external adviser, CNL Realty Advisor Inc., and became a self-advised, self-managed REIT.

In February 2004, Craig Macnab was named chief executive officer of the company. In May 2004, he was also named president.

In 2005, the company acquired National Properties Corporation for $61 million.

In May 2006, the company changed its name to National Retail Properties, Inc.

In 2015, the company acquired 19 Frisch's restaurants in the Cincinnati, Ohio area for $47 million in a leaseback transaction.

In April 2017, Craig Macnab retired and Jay Whitehurst became CEO & President of the company.

References

External links

1984 establishments in Maryland
Companies based in Orlando, Florida
Companies listed on the New York Stock Exchange
Real estate investment trusts of the United States
Real estate companies established in 1984